Swart is an unincorporated community in Vernon County, in the U.S. state of Missouri.

History
Swart was platted in 1893, and named after D. S. Swart, the original owner of the town site. A post office called Swart was established in 1893, and remained in operation until 1919. Variant names were "Swarts" and "Swartz".

References

Unincorporated communities in Vernon County, Missouri
Unincorporated communities in Missouri